Dallas Children's Theater (DCT) is a professional theater organization based in Dallas, Texas, that focuses on producing theater for youth and families. It reaches an audience of 250,000 youth annually with its nine main stage productions, national touring company, and education programs. In 2004 Time magazine named it one of the top five theaters in the country performing for youth.

Description
Robyn Flatt and Dennis Vincent founded DCT, a 501(c)(3) organization, in 1984.  Since its opening, it has become the largest not-for-profit family theater in the Southwest, operating on an annual budget of more than $3 million. Its 11 annual productions are staged in the Rosewood Center for Family Arts. The Rosewood Center also houses its youth programming, including its theater academy and education programs such as Curtains Up on Reading.

DCT's staff works to increase the body of theater for youth. Its artistic staff has written, adapted, and/or staged more than 40 world premier plays and musicals since its opening in 1984. As of April 8, 2018 Dallas Children's Theater has presented 76 world premiers, performed 212 distinct tiles, 356 individual productions, 12,944 performances for 4,866,327 people. Notable productions include Yana Wana's Legend of the Bluebonnet, Teen Brain: The Musical, EAT (It's Not About Food), Treasure Island: Reimagined!, and Mariachi Girl. (All titles listed in "Production history" below.)  In addition to new works, its repertoire also includes well-known literary works, histories, biographies, fables, and other familiar stories.

DCT has been recognized by both Time and American Theatre magazines as one of the leading professional theaters in the United States. DCT is affiliated with the Actors' Equity Association, the Theatre Communications Group, ASSITEJ International (Theater for Young Audiences/USA), and the American Alliance for Theatre and Education (AATE).

2019-20 season sponsors were: Texas Instruments, City of Dallas Office of Cultural Affairs, The Shubert Foundation, TACA, The William Randolph Hearst Foundation, Anonymous Family, The Carlson Foundation, March Family Foundation, and Hoblitzelle Foundation.

General sponsors include: The Rosewood Corporation, Vibeke Jarnum & Niels Anderskouv, Karen & Ken Travis, Anonymous Family, Lisa K Simmons, Elizabeth & Bart Showalter, Dallas Convention and Visitors Bureau, The Theodore and Beulah Beasley Foundation, Inc., The Estate of Caroline Rose Hunt, and The Carl B. & Florence E. King Foundation.

Additional support is provided by: Texas Commission on the Arts and the National Endowment for the Arts, TXU Energy, Capital for Kids, Legacy Texas Bank, Frost Bank, Stephen M. Seay Foundation, Orien Levy Woolf & Dr. Jack Woolf Charitable Trust, The Eugene McDermott Foundation, Karen & Jim Wiley, The Hersh Foundation, Jennifer & Peter Altabef, Mickie & Jeff Bragalone, Holly & Tom Mayer and Maile & Charles Shea, Maintenance Inc., The Perot Foundation, Strake Foundation, Which Wich?, and Green Mountain Energy, DCT's official renewable energy partner.

Sensory friendly sponsors include: The Melinda & Jim Johnson Family Charitable Fund, Fichtenbaum Charitable Trust, Chi Omega Christmas Market, The Sapphire Foundation, and DCT's Fall Family Party Contributors.

DCT's national touring sponsor is Neiman Marcus.

DCT offers educational and enrichment programs for children and teens in the Dallas Community.  Programs include an annual national touring production that visits more than 50 cities every year; a student matinee performance series that allows underprivileged children and school programs to attend theater performances at a reduced rate; an arts-in-education program entitled "Curtains Up on Reading"; academy classes for kids and teens; after school programs; and programs created for teens.

To engage young people in transformational theatrical experiences, DCT provides a professional season of diverse, quality productions for youth and families, year-round education and outreach programs, and a national touring company that travels to over 52 cities and 26 states each year.

DCT enriches the lives of over 250,000 children and families annually.

Executive Artistic Director Robyn Flatt
Robyn Flatt has served as the executive artistic director of DCT since she co-founded the organization in 1984.  In November 2008, she established the Baker Idea Institute, which holds annual symposia to address creativity and artistic expression in education.

Flatt earned a Master of Fine Arts degree from Baylor University.  She served as a member of the Resident Professional Company of the Dallas Theater Center for twenty years before founding DCT.

Flatt has served on the boards of the American Alliance for Theatre and Education and the US branch of the International Association of Theatre for Children and Young People (ASSITEJ/USA). She has received many honors and awards, including induction into the College of Fellows of the American Theatre in 2007.

DCT programs
DCT's Production Season offers plays (9 this season) for family audiences on an array of topics and themes, from favorite stories as Disney's Beauty and the Beast and Schoolhouse Rock Live! to work based on time-honored children's literature such as The Lion, the Witch and the Wardrobe. DCT opens the holiday with the favorite The Very Hungry Caterpillar Christmas Show and the charming classic Little Women. DCT offers musicals, dramas, puppet theater and everything in between to delight audiences of all ages. DCT also presents plays featuring issues of particular relevance to teens and their families, and reaches out again to the youngest audiences with Balloonacy.

DCT on Tour travels throughout North America presenting the professional company to over 100,000 students and families in 60 cities coast-to-coast. The tour went international in 2006 when they represented the U.S. at the International Children's Arts Expo in Shanghai, China and in 2014-2015 when they had four stops in Ontario, Canada. OCT On Tour has played the JFK Center for the Performing Arts in Washington, DC and the Luther Burbank Center for the Arts in Santa Rsa, CA The tour has reached many underserved children in rural and hard-to-reach places, such as Joplin, MO; Topeka, KS; Waco, TX; Klamath Falls, OR; Everett, WA and Anchorage, AK, to name but a few. Its first touring production premiered in 1996. Popular touring productions include Mufaro's Beautiful Daughters, Diary of a Worm, A Spider & a Fly, and Flat Stanley. In 2009, Mufaro's Beautiful Daughters was designated as an NEA (National Endowment for the Arts) American Masterpieces Touring Artist for that year.

DCT's Student Matinee Performance Series annually reaches 50,000 students and teachers with weekday performances of DCT mainstage productions. While tickets are regularly anywhere from $15 to $30 each, schools pay no more than $9.50. Free online study guides help teachers to link students' theater experience with curriculum-related activities. DCT provides free and deeply discounted tickets to low-income "at-risk" children and families and to Title I schools. This year, DCT will also present matinee performances of Diary of a Worm, a Spider & a Fly at Moody Performance Hall. For the third year in partnership with DISD Fine Arts, the program has included 35 performances designed to ensure all 14,000 second graders are guaranteed a live theater experience at DCT.

The DCT Academy for Theater Arts offers year-round classes to over 2,000 young people, ages 3 1 /2 to 18. The spring and fall sessions last 11 weeks, with 350 students in 20 classes per session each. Classes include beginning to advanced theater arts and are taught by theater professionals with a focus on the development of imagination, communication skills, collaborative problem solving and performance techniques. Showbiz Summer offers over 50 classes. The Teen Conservatory offers exciting opportunities for older students. Scholarships are available.

Curtains Up on Reading is an in-school residency that integrates drama, literature, language arts, social studies and history. DCT artists collaborate with teachers in DISD elementary schools (up to 2,000 students) to incorporate drama into the core curriculum. Interdisciplinary units are designed and taught using a hands-on approach to enhancing students' understanding of the material, build enthusiasm for learning, and develop self-confidence. This is particularly effective in working with low-performing youth impeded by language barriers and learning difficulties. History comes alive through characterization and students' role development.

Curtains Up on Literacy is a partnership with Literacy Achieves (formerly VMLC-Vickery, West and Elm) that links adult literacy and pre-K children's classes with creative drama and professional theater performances in a free, cross-generational program for 30 to 40 families.

Teen Scene nurtures theater audiences and professionals of tomorrow by opening communication among teens, theater professionals and the community at large. It also provides teens with points of access to DCT productions and opportunities to engage in professional theater experiences. As a forum for young adults to collaborate and create together, the Teen Scene initiative provides a home base for lifelong learning.

After School and Summer Drama Classes benefit "at-risk" youth through after-school satellite programs. Students learn the creative process, teamwork and communications in an arts educational format taught by professional theater artists. A semester ends with a play written and based on the group's shared life experiences.

Community engagement has grown DCT's audiences of color by 19.5% as a direct result of deliberate efforts such as DCT Showtime (excerpts from the current mainstage lineup at 14 public libraries, two DISD schools and one city park, totaling 17 performances) and our Neighborhood See-A-Play Date initiative which directly targets people living within our 10 mile radius who perhaps have never experienced live theater or appreciated its benefits. Combined with another program, DCT Storytime, DCT made appearances at 41 libraries and community groups in 2016-2017 alone. All of these programs are presented at no cost to participants.

Because 175,000+ DFW children with autism and other developmental disabilities struggle with sitting still, crowds, loud noises, darkness, and flashing lights, most can't access live theater. So, Dallas Children's Theater offers sensory-friendly play performances that feature a relaxed, welcoming environment; friendly, trained staff; affordable pricing; special pre- and post-show activities; reduced sound; increased lighting in seating area; and custom lighting plans to reduce harsh stage lighting. DCT also offers and specialized drama classes with low student-to-staff ratios and customized curriculum for students with developmental disabilities. Dallas Children's Theater's sensory-friendly drama experiences are proven to increase understanding of emotion, learning, and positive peer interaction for children with developmental disabilities.

Kathy Burks Theater of Puppetry Arts
Founded in 1973, the Kathy Burks Theater of Puppetry Arts has been affiliated with DCT since 1996. It uses all styles of puppetry, including traditional bridge and cabaret marionettes, hand puppets, shadow puppets, and Black Theater rod puppets.  Kathy Burks' puppets are often featured in other DCT mainstage productions.

The Kathy Burks Theater of Puppetry Arts stores its collection of over 1,000 puppets, both new and antique, at DCT's Rosewood Center for Family Arts.

Venues
DCT productions began running at El Centro Community College in 1984, and continued to do so continuously until 2003.  In 1987, with the support of The Rosewood Corporation and the Meadows Foundation, they moved their administrative offices and some performances to the Crescent Theater in Dallas.

In 2003 DCT moved from the Crescent Theater into the 58,000 sq. ft. Rosewood Center for Family Arts with the Baker Theater (seats 400) and Studio Theater (seats 150), five classrooms, community gathering room and space for costume, scenic, shops and storage.

Awards and recognition
 1986: DCT is awarded Winifred Ward Award for "Outstanding New Children's Theater" by American Association of Theater for Youth
 1992: DCT is ranked #1 among Dallas cultural institutions by Cultural Affairs Commission review
 1993: DCT is honored as Professional Children's Theater of the Year by the Southwest Theater Association
 1994: DCT is voted "Best Arts Group in the City" by DallasChild magazine reader poll
 1995: DCT is named "Best Children's Theater" in both DallasChild and "Best Family Entertainment" by Dallas Observer
 1996: DCT is ranked #1 by Texas Commission for the Arts in both Institutional and Arts Education categories
 2000: DCT's Linda Daugherty, resident playwright, is awarded the Bondermann Award for her play Bless Cricket, Crest Toothpaste, and Tommy Tune.
 2004: DCT is rated one of the top five children's theaters in the nation by Time magazine
 2010: DCT is honored when Executive Artistic Director, Robyn Flatt, is among national and local nominees for Texan of the Year by The Dallas Morning News 
 2011: DCT is honored when resident playwright, Linda Daugherty, is among national and local nominees for Texan of the Year by The Dallas Morning News 
 2013: DCT is selected by DallasChild magazine readers as the Best Theater for Children in  "Best For Families 2013" feature

Production history

1984-1985
 Babes in Toyland, directed by Dennis W. Vincent and John R. Stevens
 A Wrinkle in Time, directed by Robyn Flatt
 The Hobbit, directed by Lee Lowrimore
 Pinocchio, directed by Dennis W. Vincent
 The Play Called Noah's Flood, directed by Karl Schaeffer

1985-1986
 Treasure Island, directed by Joe Calk
 The Wizard of Oz, directed by John R. Stevens
 The Legend of the Bluebonnet & the Ice Wolf, directed by Robyn Flatt
 The Long Winter, directed by Dennis W. Vincent
 Raggedy Ann and Andy, directed by John R. Stevens
 The Revenge of the Space Pandas, directed by Karl Schaeffer

1986-1987
 The Outlaw Robin Hood, directed by Karl Schaeffer
 The Best Christmas Pageant Ever, directed by Robyn Flatt
 Most Valuable Player, directed by Cecilia Flores (Southwest Premiere)
 A Wind in the Door, directed by Dennis W. Vincent
 Peter Pan, directed by John R. Stevens
 James and the Giant Peach, directed by Robyn Flatt

1987-1988
 The Miracle Worker, directed by Robyn Flatt
 Kegger, directed by John R. Stevens
 Doors, directed by Jenna Worthen
 The Best Christmas Pageant Ever, directed by Robyn Flatt
 The Velveteen Rabbit & The Wild Things, directed by Dennis W. Vincent & Nancy Schaeffer
 The Secret Garden, directed by Robyn Flatt & Artie Olaisen
 Tom Sawyer, directed by John R. Stevens
 Charlie and the Chocolate Factory, directed by Dennis W. Vincent

1988-1989
 Kabuki Sleeping Beauty, directed by Rick Ney
 The Woods at Bear Bottom, directed by Paul Baker (world premiere)
 The Best Christmas Pageant Ever, directed by Dennis W. Vincent
 Merry Christmas, Strega Nona, directed by John R. Stevens
 To Kill a Mockingbird, directed by Robyn Flatt
 Tales of a Fourth Grade Nothing, directed by Dennis W. Vincent
 Prodigy, directed by Artie Olaisen
 Cinderella, or Everybody Needs a Fairy Godmother, directed by Dennis W. Vincent & Linda Daugherty (world premiere)
 The Ransom of Red Chief, directed by Karl Schaeffer
 The Lion, the Witch and the Wardrobe, directed by Robyn Flatt & Mark Gruber

1989-1990
 Babar, directed by Dennis W. Vincent
 The Diary of Anne Frank, directed by Robyn Flatt
 Christmas Dreams, directed by John R. Stevens
 The Snow Queen, directed by Artie Olaisen
 Dragon, directed by Yuli Gusman (American Premiere)
 Ghosts of Japan, directed by Rick Ney
 The Odyssey, directed by Artie Olaisen
 The Phantom Tollbooth, directed by Elly Lindsay
 Winnie the Pooh, directed by Jerry Ayers
 Sherlock Holmes and the Baker Street Irregulars, directed by Robyn Flatt

1990-1991
 Snow White, directed by Robyn Flatt
 Frankenstein, directed by Artie Olaisen
 The Best Christmas Pageant Ever, directed by Nancy Schaeffer
 Santa's Alive and Well and Momma's Got Him in the Kitchen, directed by Dennis W. Vincent (world premiere)
 The Frog Princess & Peter and the Wolf, directed by Dennis W. Vincent & Nancy Schaeffer
 Sisters, directed by Cecilia Flores
 African Tales of Ananse the Spider Man, directed by Robyn Flatt (world premiere)
 Charlotte's Web, directed by Beverly Renquist
 Whale, directed by Robyn Flatt (associate: Karl Schaeffer)
 The Magician's Nephew, directed by Elly Lindsay
 Treasure Island, directed by Artie Olaisen

1991-1992
 The Little Mermaid, directed by Dennis W. Vincent (world premiere)
 Dracula, the Vampire Play, directed by Artie Olaisen
 The Best Christmas Pageant Ever, directed by Nancy Schaeffer
 The Daughter of St. Nicholas, directed by Robyn Flatt
 Jungal Book, directed by Artie Olaisen
 Most Valuable Player, directed by Cecilia Flores
 Maggie Magalita, directed by Elly Lindsay (Southwest Premiere)
 The Reluctant Dragon, directed by Robyn Flatt
 A Tale of Twelfth Night, directed by Paul Munger
 Pinocchio 2142: A Space Adventure, directed by Dennis W. Vincent (world premiere)
 The Adventures of Oliver Twist, directed by Robyn Flatt

1992-1993
 Beauty and the Beast, directed by Steve Peterson
 The Canterville Ghost, directed by Artie Olaisen
 The Best Christmas Pageant Ever, directed by Nancy Schaeffer
 Come Into the Light, directed by Dennis W. Vincent (world premiere)
 Anne of Green Gables, directed by Robyn Flatt
 Ananse's Tales of Africa, directed by Rob Hubbard
 Dinosaurs, directed by Sally Fiorello
 A Wrinkle in Time, directed by Artie Olaisen
 Fiesta Mexicana: Tales from the Land of the Feathered Serpent, directed by Dolores Godinez
 Aladdin and the Wonderful Lamp, directed by Artie Olaisen
 The Island of the Skog, directed by Robyn Flatt (world premiere)

1993-1994
 Ramona Quimby, directed by Elly Lindsay
 The Curse of Castle Mongrew, directed by Artie Olaisen
 The Best Christmas Pageant Ever, directed by Nancy Schaeffer
 Kringle's Window, directed by Dennis W. Vincent & Brent Hasty
 The Prince and the Pauper, directed by Robyn Flatt
 Apollo: To the Moon, directed by Cecilia Flores & Karl Schaeffer
 Bridge to Terabithia, directed by Robyn Flatt
 The Secret Garden, directed by Artie Olaisen
 Make Me Pele for a Day, directed by Clay Houston
 The Wizard of Oz, directed by Nancy Schaeffer
 Sleeping Beauty: The Hundred Year Adventure, directed by Dennis W. Vincent (world premiere)

1994-1995
 Charlotte's Web, directed by Andre du Broc
 The Mummy's Claw, directed by Artie Olaisen
 Just in the Nick of Time, directed by Andre du Broc (world premiere)
 The Best Christmas Pageant Ever, directed by Nancy Schaeffer
 A Woman Called Truth, directed by Ptosha Storey (Southwest Premiere)
 Beauty and the Beast, directed by David Fisher
 The Rememberer, directed by Robyn Flatt (Southwest Premiere)
 The Lion, the Witch and the Wardrobe, directed by Artie Olaisen
 If You Give a Mouse a Cookie, directed by Dennis W. Vincent
 Sherlock Holmes and the Baker Street Irregulars, directed by Robyn Flatt
 Cinderella or Everybody Needs a Fairy Godmother, directed by Nancy Schaeffer

1995-1996
 Winnie the Pooh, directed by Trudy Wheeler
 Little Women, directed by Pamela Sterling
 Come into the Light, directed by John Hanby
 The Christmas Witch, directed by Robyn Flatt (world premiere)
 Lyle Lyle Crocodile, directed by Nancy Schaeffer
 A Woman Called Truth, directed by Ptosha Storey
 Star Path Moon Stop, directed by Robyn Flatt (world premiere)
 Little Women, directed by Andrew Gaupp & Pamela Sterling
 Tuck Everlasting, directed by Artie Olaisen
 Jack and the Giant Bean Stalk, directed by Nancy Schaeffer (world premiere)
 Snow White, directed by Artie Olaisen

1996-1997
 Cinderella or Everybody Needs a Fairy Godmother, directed by Cheryl Denson
 The Boy Who Drew Cats and Other Tales, directed by Danny Tamez
 Frankenstein, directed by Artie Olaisen
 The Nutcracker, Kathy Burks Theater of Puppetry Arts
 The Best Christmas Pageant Ever, directed by Nancy Schaeffer
 Dinosaur, directed by Pam Myers-Morgan
 To Kill a Mockingbird, directed by Robyn Flatt
 The Yellow Boat, directed by Andrew Gaupp
 Pecos Bill, directed by Nancy Schaeffer (world premiere)
 A Little Princess, directed by Artie Olaisen
 Peter Pan, directed by Robyn Flatt
 Rumplestilskin, directed by Artie Olaisen (world premiere)

1997-1998
 Jack and the Giant Beanstalk, directed by Nancy Schaeffer
 Charlie and the Chocolate Factory, directed by Andy Long
 The Hound of the Baskervilles, directed by Artie Olaisen
 Not a Creature was Stirring, Kathy Burks Theater of Puppetry Arts
 The Christmas Witch, directed by Robyn Flatt (world premiere)
 A Glory Over Everything, directed by Ptosha Storey
 Bunnicula, directed by Nancy Schaeffer
 The Miracle Worker, directed by Robyn Flatt
 Young King Arthur, directed by Artie Olaisen (world premiere)
 The Emperor's New Clothes, directed by Artie Olaisen
 The Island of the Skog, directed by Robyn Flatt (world premiere)

1998-1999
 The Island of the Skog, directed by Robyn Flatt (national tour)
 Babe, the Sheep Pig, directed by Nancy Schaeffer (US Premiere)
 Dracula, the Vampire Play, directed by Artie Olaisen
 The Nutcracker, Kathy Burks Theater of Puppetry Arts
 The Best Christmas Pageant Ever, directed by Nancy Schaeffer
 Most Valuable Player, directed by Guinea Lada Bennett
 The Princess and the Pea, directed by Robyn Flatt & Andy Long
 Shakespeare Out of Pocket, directed by Tony Medlin
 Adventures of Huckleberry Finn, directed by Robyn Flatt
 Heidi, directed by Andrew Gaupp (world premiere)
 You're a Good Man, Charlie Brown, directed by Peppy Biddy
 The Hobbit, directed by Artie Olaisen

1999-2000
 Young King Arthur, directed by Sally Fiorello & Douglass Burks (national tour)
 Miss Nelson is Missing, directed by Nancy Schaeffer
 The Canterville Ghost, directed by Artie Olaisen
 The Nutcracker, Kathy Burks Theater of Puppetry Arts
 Miracle on 34th Street, directed by Robyn Flatt
 If You Give a Moose a Muffin, directed by Nancy Schaeffer
 Roll of Thunder, Hear My Cry, directed by Guinea Lada Bennett
 Island of the Blue Dolphins, directed by Robyn Flatt
 Charlotte's Web, directed by Andy Long
 Bless Cricket, Crest Toothpaste, and Tommy Tune, directed by Robyn Flatt (Southwest Premiere)
 The Surprising Story of the Three Little Pigs, directed by Nancy Schaeffer (world premiere)

2000-2001
 Heidi, directed by Kathy Byrne (national tour)
 The Boxcar Children, directed by Nancy Schaeffer
 The Mummy's Claw, directed by Artie Olaisen
 The Best Christmas Pageant Ever, directed by Nancy Schaeffer
 Not a Creature was Stirring, Kathy Burks Theater for Puppetry Arts
 The Three Sillies, directed by Robyn Flatt (world premiere)
 My Lord What a Morning, directed by Artie Olaisen
 The Great Gilly Hopkins, directed by Robyn Flatt
 Tom Sawyer, directed by Andrew Gaupp
 The BFG-Big Friendly Giant, directed by Artie Olaisen
 African Tales of Earth and Sky, directed by Robyn Flatt (world premiere)

2001-2002
 The Three Sillies, directed by Andy Long (national tour)
 Honk!, directed by Nancy Schaeffer
 Gatherings in Graveyards, directed by Artie Olaisen
 Hans Brinker or the Silver Skates, directed by Cheryl Denson (world premiere)
 African Tales of Earth and Sky, directed by Robyn Flatt
 Sideways Stories from Wayside School, directed by Nancy Schaeffer
 Deadly Weapons, directed by Graham Whitehead
 Lilly's Purple Plastic Purse, directed by Nancy Schaeffer
 And Then They Came for Me, directed by Robyn Flatt
 Alexander and the Terrible, Horrible, No Good, Very Bad Day, directed by Peppy Biddu

2002-2003
 African Tales of Earth and Sky, directed by Robyn Flatt (national tour)
 Amelia Bedelia, directed by Andy Long
 Grimm Tales, directed by Artie Olaisen
 The Nutcracker, Kathy Burks Theater of Puppetry Arts
 The Best Christmas Pageant Ever, directed by Nancy Schaeffer
 Miss Nelson is Back!, directed by Nancy Schaeffer
 Holes, directed by Artie Olaisen
 Johnny Tremain, directed by Robyn Flatt
 Alexander and the Terrible, Horrible, No Good, Very Bad Day, directed by Peppy Biddy
 Coyote Tales, directed by Robyn Flatt (world premiere)
 The Jungal Book, directed by Artie Olaisen

2003-2004
 And Then They Came for Me, directed by Robyn Flatt (national tour)
 The Island of the Skog, directed by Nancy Schaeffer
 Hoot Owl Hootenanny, Kathy Burks Theater for Puppetry Arts, directed by Doug Burks
 Frankenstein, directed by Artie Olaisen
 Not a Creature was Stirring, Kathy Burks Theater for Puppetry Arts
 Hans Brinker or the Silver Skates, directed by Cheryl Denson
 The Stinky Cheese Man and Other Fair(l)y (Stoopid) Tales, directed by Nancy Schaeffer
 The Outsiders, directed by Robyn Flatt
 The Lion, the Witch, and the Wardrobe, directed by Artie Olaisen
 Sarah Plain and Tall, directed by Robyn Flatt
 Go, Dog, Go!, directed by Nancy Schaeffer
 Treasure Island, directed by Artie Olaisen

2004-2005
 To Kill a Mockingbird, directed by Robyn Flatt
 Rumplestilskin, Kathy Burks Theater for Puppetry Arts
 The Velveteen Rabbit, directed by Robyn Flatt (world premiere)
 The Best Christmas Pageant Ever, directed by Nancy Schaeffer
 If You Give a Mouse a Cookie, directed by Nancy Schaeffer
 A Midnight Cry, directed by Sally Fiorello
 The Frog Prince, Kathy Burks Theater for Puppetry Arts
 The Magician's Nephew, directed by Artie Olaisen
 The Wrestling Season, directed by Rene Moreno
 Coyote Tales, directed by Andy Long (national tour)
 Stuart Little, directed by Nancy Schaeffer

2005-2006
 Charlotte's Web, directed by Robyn Flatt
 Everyday Heroes, directed by Andy Long
 The Nutcracker, Kathy Burks Theater for Puppetry Arts
 A Laura Ingalls Wilder Christmas, directed by Robyn Flatt
 Junie B. Jones & a Little Monkey Business, directed by Nancy Schaeffer
 Ananse the Spider Man, directed by Robyn Flatt
 Winnie the Pooh, Kathy Burks Theater for Puppetry Arts
 The Secret Garden, directed by Artie Olaisen
 The Music Lesson, directed by J. Daniel Herring
 The Stinky Cheese Man and Other Fair(l)y (Stoopid) Tales, directed by Nancy Schaeffer (national tour)
 The Emperor's New Clothes, directed by Artie Olaisen
 When I was a Child, directed by Ted Perry

2006-2007
 If You Give a Pig a Party, directed by Nancy Schaeffer (world premiere)
 Night of the Living Dead, directed by Artie Olaisen
 The Velveteen Rabbit, directed by Robyn Flatt
 The Best Christmas Pageant Ever, directed by Nancy Schaeffer
 The Miracle Worker, directed by Robyn Flatt
 Carnival of the Animals, Kathy Burks Theater for Puppetry Arts
 Sleeping Beauty, directed by Andy Long
 James and the Giant Peach, directed by Robyn Flatt
 The Secret Life of Girls, directed by Nancy Schaeffer (world premiere)
 A Midnight Cry, directed by Sally Fiorello (national tour)
 Pinkerton!!!, directed by Robyn Flatt (world premiere)

2007-2008
 Tales of a Fourth Grade Nothing, directed by Matt Lyle
 Night of the Living Dead, directed by Artie Olaisen
 The Nutcracker, Kathy Burks Theater for Puppetry Arts
 A Little House Christmas, directed by Robyn Flatt
 Goodnight Moon, directed by Nancy Schaeffer
 Mufaro's Beautiful Daughters, directed by Robyn Flatt
 House at Pooh Corner, Kathy Burks Theater for Puppetry Arts, directed by Doug Burks
 The Giver, directed by Artie Olaisen
 Eat: It's Not About the Food, directed by Nancy Schaeffer (world premiere)
 If You Give a Pig a Party, directed by Nancy Schaeffer (national tour)
 A Year with Frog and Toad, directed by Cheryl Denson

2008-2009
 Lilly's Purple Plastic Purse, directed by Nancy Schaeffer
 The Mummy's Claw, directed by Artie Olaisen
 Madeline's Christmas, directed by Nancy Schaeffer
 Santa's Holiday for Strings, Kathy Burks Theater for Puppetry Arts, directed by Doug Burks & Sally Fiorello
 Mufaro's Beautiful Daughters, directed by Robyn Flatt (national tour)
 Click Clack Moo: Cows that Type, directed by Doug Miller
 Honus and Me, directed by Andy Long
 The Tale of Peter Rabbit, Kathy Burks Theater for Puppetry Arts
 don't u luv me?, directed by Nancy Schaeffer (world premiere)
 And Then They Came for Me, directed by Robyn Flatt
 The Neverending Story, directed by Artie Olaisen

2009-2010
 Junie B. Jones & a Little Monkey Business, directed by Nancy Schaeffer
 The Best Christmas Pageant Ever, directed by Nancy Schaeffer
 Santa's Holiday for Strings, Kathy Burks Theater of Puppetry Arts
 How I Became a Pirate, directed by Nancy Schaeffer (Regional Premiere)
 Hansel and Gretel, Kathy Burks Theater of Puppetry Arts
 The Lion, the Witch, and the Wardrobe, directed by Artie Olaisen
 hard 2 spel dad, directed by Robyn Flatt (world premiere)
 Carnival of the Animals, Kathy Burks Theater of Puppetry Arts
 Most Valuable Player, directed by Andy Long
 Giggle, Giggle, Quack, directed by Doug Miller (Regional Premiere)

2010-2011
 Giggle, Giggle, Quack, directed by Doug Miller (national tour)
 Miss Nelson is Missing!, directed by Nancy Schaeffer
 The Curse of Castle Mongrew, directed by Artie Olaisen
 Junie B. in Jingle Bells, Batman Smells!, directed by Nancy Schaeffer (Regional Premiere)
 The Snow Queen, Kathy Burks Theater of Puppetry Arts (world premiere)
 The True Story of the Three Little Pigs!, directed by Cheryl Denson (Regional Premiere)
 Teen Scene Festival: dont u luv me? (professional production), hard 2 spel dad (professional production), EAT: It's Not About Food (students), The Secret Life of Girls (students)
 The Frog Prince, Kathy Burks Theater of Puppetry Arts
 Tuck Everlasting, directed by Artie Olaisen
 Senora Tortuga, directed by Robyn Flatt and Roxanne Schroeder-Arce
 The Pied Piper's Magic, directed by Robyn Flatt (world premiere)

2011-2012
 Alexander and the Terrible, Horrible, No Good, Very Bad Day, directed by Doug Miller
 Madeline's Christmas, directed by Nancy Schaeffer
 The Nutcracker, Kathy Burks Theater of Puppetry Arts
 If You Give a Mouse a Cookie, directed by Nancy Schaeffer
 The Secret Life of Girls, directed by Nancy Schaeffer
 Young King Arthur, Kathy Burks Theater of Puppetry Arts
 Anne of Green Gables, directed by Robyn Flatt
 Diary of a Worm, a Spider and a Fly, directed by Bob Hess (Regional Professional Premiere)
 Mufaro's Beautiful Daughters, directed by Robyn Flatt (national tour)

2012-2013
 Pinkalicious: The Musical, directed by Nancy Schaeffer 
 The Nutcracker, Kathy Burks Theater of Puppetry Arts
 Junie B. in Jingle Bells, Batman Smells, directed by Nancy Schaeffer
 Goodnight Moon, directed by Nancy Schaeffer
 Rumpelstiltskin, Kathy Burks Theater of Puppetry Arts
 A Wrinkle in Time, directed by Artie Olaisen 
 The Musical Adventures of Flat Stanley, directed by Michael Serrecchia
 The True Story of the 3 Little Pigs!, directed by Doug Miller

2013-2014
 Dr. Seuss's The Cat in the Hat, directed by Nancy Schaeffer
 Ghouls & Graveyards, directed by Artie Olaisen & Karl Schaeffer
 Twas the Night Before Christmas, directed by Robyn Flatt & Doug Miller
 The Nutcracker, Kathy Burks Theater of Puppetry Arts
 Go, Dog. Go!, directed by Nancy Schaeffer
 Little Women, directed by Nancy Schaeffer, Teen Scene
 Beauty and the Beast, Kathy Burks Theater of Puppetry Arts
 Mariachi Girl, directed by Robyn Flatt & David Lozano
 Charlotte's Web, directed by Artie Olaisen
 Stuart Little, directed by Doug Miller (national tour)

2014-2015
 Rapunzel! Rapunzel! A Very Hairy Fairy Tale, directed by Nancy Schaeffer
 Night of the Living Dead, directed by Artie Olaisen & Karl Schaeffer, Teen Scene
 Miracle on 34th Street, directed by Robyn Flatt & Doug Miller
 Frosty & Friends, Kathy Burks Theater of Puppetry Arts
 Skippyjon Jones, directed by Nancy Schaeffer
 Teen Brain: The Musical, directed by Nancy Schaeffer, Teen Scene
 The Tale of Peter Rabbit, Kathy Burks Theater of Puppetry Arts
 Balloonacy, directed by Dick Monday
 Jackie & Me, directed by Rene Moreno
 The Musical Adventures of Flat Stanley, directed by Michael Serrecchia (national tour)

2015-2016
 Fancy Nancy, directed by Nancy Schaeffer
 Sleepy Hollow, directed by Artie Olaisen, Teen Scene
 Miracle on 34th Street, directed by Robyn Flatt & Doug Miller
 Not a Creature Was Stirring, Kathy Burks Theater of Puppetry Arts
 A Year with Frog and Toad, directed by Cheryl Denson
 dont u luv me?, directed by Nancy Schaeffer, Teen Scene
 Hansel and Gretel, Kathy Burks Theater of Puppetry Arts
 The Miraculous Journey of Edward Tulane, directed by Artie Olaisen
 Balloonacy, directed by Dick Monday
 Pinkalicious The Musical, directed by Nancy Schaeffer
 The BFG (Big Friendly Giant), directed by Doug Burks (national tour)

2016-2017
 Seussical, directed by Nancy Schaeffer
 Dracula: The Vampire Play, directed by Artie Olaisen, Teen Scene
 A Charlie Brown Christmas, directed by Doug Miller
 The Nutcracker, Kathy Burks Theater of Puppetry Arts
 Junie B. Jones Is Not a Crook, directed by Nancy Schaeffer
 EAT (It's Not About Food), directed by Nancy Schaeffer, Teen Scene
 Jack and the Beanstalk, Kathy Burks Theater of Puppetry Arts
 Tomas and the Library Lady, directed by Robyn Flatt
 Blue, directed by Dick Monday
 James and the Giant Peach, directed by Artie Olaisen
 Mufaro's Beautiful Daughters, directed by Robyn Flatt (national tour)

2017-2018
 Goosebumps the Musical: Phantom of the Auditorium, directed by Nancy Schaeffer
 Ghouls & Graveyards, directed by Artie Olaisen, Teen Scene
 A Charlie Brown Christmas, directed by Doug Miller
 Frosty & Friends, Kathy Burks Theater of Puppetry Arts
 The Very Hungry Caterpillar Show, directed by Doug Burks
 Screen Play, directed by Nancy Schaeffer, Teen Scene
 Yana Wana's Legend of the Bluebonnet, directed by Robyn Flatt
 Blue, directed by Dick Monday
 Jungalbook, directed by Artie Olaisen
 How I Became a Pirate, directed by Doug Miller (national tour)

2018-2019
 Treasure Island: Reimagined!, directed by Robyn Flatt
 A Wrinkle In Time, directed by Artie Olaisen, Teen Scene
 Magic Tree House's Holiday Musical: A Ghost Tale for Mr. Dickens, directed by Nancy Schaeffer
 The Snowy Day and Other Stories by Ezra Jack Keats, directed by Guinea Bennett-Price
 Ella Enchanted: The Musical, directed by Nancy Schaeffer
 The Secret Life of Girls, directed by Nancy Schaeffer, Teen Scene
 Tuck Everlasting, directed by Artie Olaisen
 The Island of the Skog, directed by Robyn Flatt
 Diary of a Worm, a Spider & a Fly, directed by BJ Cleveland (national tour)

2019-2020
 Disney's Beauty and the Beast, directed by Nancy Schaeffer
 The Very Hungry Caterpillar Christmas Show, directed by Douglass Burks
 Little Women: the Musical, directed by K. Doug Miller
 Schoolhouse Rock Live!, directed by Nancy Schaeffer
 Last Stop on Market Street, directed by Vickie Washington
 Balloonacy, directed by Dick Monday
 Miss Nelson Has a Field Day, directed by K. Doug Miller

2020-2021
 Andi Boi, directed by Bruce R. Coleman 
 Miss Nelson Has a Field Day, directed by K. Doug Miller
 Idris Goodwin's Social Justice Play: Watergun Song, directed by Jamal Gibran Sterling
 Idris Goodwin’s Social Justice Play: Nothing Rhymes With Juneteenth, directed by Cherish Robinson
 The Raven Society, directed by Nancy Schaeffer and Teen Scene
 Idris Goodwin’s Social Justice Play: #Matter, directed by Feleceia Wilson (Benton)
 My Faraway Adventure Kit, directed by Dick Monday

2021-2022
 DCT Presents...Circo Metropolis, directed by Dick Monday
 Paddington Saves Christmas, directed by Douglass Burks
 Dragons Love Tacos, directed by Nancy Schaeffer
 The Lion, The Witch, and the Wardrobe, directed by Artie Olaisen
 10 seconds, directed by Richard Quadri

References

Sources
 Churnin, Nancy. "Dallas Children's Theater celebrates its 25th Anniversary". The Dallas Morning News, May 13, 2009.

Theatre companies in Dallas
Children's theatre